Dominic Paul Fletcher (born September 2, 1997) is an American professional baseball outfielder in the Arizona Diamondbacks organization.

Career
Fletcher attended Cypress High School in Cypress, California. As a senior in 2015, he was named the Orange County Register Player of the Year after batting .365 with 27 RBIs. After graduating, he enrolled at the University of Arkansas where he played college baseball. As a freshman, Fletcher started 56 games in centerfield and hit .291 with 64 hits, 12 home runs, and 37 RBIs, earning freshman All-American honors from the National Collegiate Baseball Writers Association and Baseball America, and the SEC All-Freshman Team. In 2019, his junior year, he hit .317/.386/.537 with 11 home runs and 61 RBIs over 64 games.

The Arizona Diamondbacks selected Fletcher in the second round, with the 75th overall selection, of the 2019 Major League Baseball draft. Fletcher signed with Arizona and made his professional debut with the Kane County Cougars of the Class A Midwest League. Over 55 games, he hit .318 with five home runs, 28 RBIs, and 14 doubles. Fletcher was assigned to the Amarillo Sod Poodles of the Double-A South for the 2021 season and slashed .264/.314/.445 with 15 home runs and 56 RBIs over 102 games. He returned to Amarillo to begin the 2022 season. After 32 games, he was promoted to the Reno Aces of the Triple-A Pacific Coast League. Over 133 games between the two teams, he slashed .312/.378/.486 with 12 home runs, 72 RBIs, and 35 doubles.

On November 15, 2022, the Diamondbacks selected Fletcher's contract and added him to the 40-man roster. Fletcher was optioned to Triple-A Reno to begin the 2023 season.

Personal life
Fletcher's brother, David, plays in MLB for the Los Angeles Angels.

References

External links

Minor league baseball players
1997 births
Living people
Baseball outfielders
Baseball players from California
Sportspeople from Orange, California
Arkansas Razorbacks baseball players
Kane County Cougars players
Amarillo Sod Poodles players
Reno Aces players
2023 World Baseball Classic players